The 2012 U.S. Men's Clay Court Championships was a tennis tournament played on outdoor clay courts. It was the 44th edition of the U.S. Men's Clay Court Championships, and was an ATP World Tour 250 event. It took place at River Oaks Country Club in Houston, Texas, United States, from April 9 through April 15, 2012.

Singles main draw entrants

Seeds

Rankings and seedings are as of April 2, 2012

Other entrants
The following players received wildcards into the main draw:
  Kevin Anderson  
  Feliciano López 
  Juan Mónaco

The following players received entry via qualifying:
  Ricardo Mello
  Michael Russell
  Go Soeda
  Horacio Zeballos

Retirements
  Carlos Berlocq (lower leg injury)
  Diego Junqueira (hip injury)

Doubles main draw entrants

Seeds

 Rankings are as of April 2, 2012

Other entrants
The following pairs received wildcards into the doubles main draw:
  Robert Kendrick /  Ryan Sweeting
  Bobby Reynolds /  Michael Russell

Finals

Singles

 Juan Mónaco defeated  John Isner 6–2, 3–6, 6–3
It was Monaco's 2nd title of the year and 5th of his career.

Doubles

 James Blake /  Sam Querrey defeated  Treat Conrad Huey /  Dominic Inglot, 7–6(16–14), 6–4

References

External links

Official website

 
U.S. Men's Clay Court Championships
U.S. Men's Clay Court Championships
U.S. Men's Clay Court Championships
U.S. Men's Clay Court Championships